Afrotarus is a genus of ground beetles in the family Carabidae. There are about 10 described species in Afrotarus.

Species
These 10 species belong to the genus Afrotarus:
 Afrotarus alluaudi Jeannel, 1949
 Afrotarus fadli Rasool; Felix; Abdel-Dayem & Aldhafer, 2017
 Afrotarus golanensis Kirschenhofer, 2010
 Afrotarus kilimanus (Kolbe, 1897)
 Afrotarus leleupi Basilewsky, 1962
 Afrotarus meruanus Basilewsky, 1962
 Afrotarus niger (Andrewes, 1935)
 Afrotarus raffrayi (Fairmaire, 1882)
 Afrotarus scotti (Basilewsky, 1948)
 Afrotarus soudaensis Rasool; Felix; Abdel-Dayem & Aldhafer, 2017

References

Lebiinae